Trinidad Airport  is an airport serving Trinidad, a town and municipality in the oil and gas-producing Casanare Department of Colombia.

See also

Transport in Colombia
List of airports in Colombia

References

External links
OpenStreetMap - Trinidad
OurAirports - Trinidad
SkyVector - Trinidad
Trinidad Airport

Airports in Colombia